Gadzhi Kamilovich Nabiev (born 5 June 1996 in Dagestan) is a Russian freestyle wrestler who competes at 79 kilograms. He won a bronze medal at the 2019 World Championships after claiming the Russian National Championship (medaled in 2017, 2018, 2020 and 2021) and became the U23 World Champion in 2017 (runner–up in 2018). He was also the 2015 Junior World Champion.

Major results

References

External links 
 

Living people
Place of birth missing (living people)
Russian male sport wrestlers
World Wrestling Championships medalists
1996 births
Sportspeople from Makhachkala